The Bustuchin oil field is an oil field located in Bustuchin, Gorj County. It was discovered in 1967 and developed by Petrom. It began production in 1968 and produces oil.

References

Oil fields in Romania